Bulat-Pestivien is a commune in the Côtes-d'Armor department of Brittany in northwestern France.

Population
The inhabitants of Bulat-Pestivien are known in French as Bulatois.

Map

Breton language
In 2009, 46.0% of primary school children attended bilingual schools.

See also
 Communes of the Côtes-d'Armor department
 List of the works of the Maître de Lanrivain

References

External links

 Official website 
 

Communes of Côtes-d'Armor